The Bezirksliga Rheinhessen-Saar was the highest association football league in the  German state of Saarland, the Rheinhessen part of the state of Hesse and parts of the Bavarian region of Palatinate and the Prussian Rhine Province from 1923 to 1927, when the league was replaced by the Bezirksliga Rhein-Saar and the Bezirksliga Main-Hessen.

Overview 
The league was formed in 1923, after a league reform which was decided upon in Darmstadt, Hesse. It replaced the Kreisliga Hessen and the Kreisliga Saar as the highest leagues in the region.

The Bezirksliga Rheinhessen-Saar, named after the region of Rhenish Hesse (German: Rheinhessen) and the river Saar,  started out with eight teams, playing each other in a home-and-away round with the league winner advancing to the Southern German championship, which in turn was a qualification tournament for the German championship.

The league modus remained unchanged for its first three seasons, 1923–24, 1924–25 and 1925-26. For its last edition however, it expanded to ten clubs. Additionally, the leagues runners-up also qualified for a "consolidation" round with the other runners-up of the southern Bezirksligas. The winner of this round was awarded the third entry spot for the south to the German finals.

In an attempt to bring all Southern German leagues to a similar system, the Bezirksligas were reorganised in 1927. For the Bezirksliga Rheinhessen-Saar, this meant, it joined with the clubs of the Bezirksliga Rhein to form the new Bezirksliga Rhein-Saar. The clubs from the Saar region became part of the new Saar division of this league. The clubs from the Rhenish Hesse region however became part of the Hessen division of the new Bezirksliga Main-Hessen. It resulted in an even split of clubs, five going to the Main-Hessen league and the other five to the Rhein-Saar league.

National success

Southern German championship
Qualified teams and their success:
 1924:
 Borussia Neunkirchen, 6th place
 1925:
 SV Wiesbaden, 5th place
 1926:
 FV Saarbrücken, 5th place
 1927:
 FV Saarbrücken, 5th place Bezirksliga-runners-up round
 FSV Mainz 05, 6th place

German championship
Qualified teams and their success:
 1924:
 none qualified
 1925:
 none qualified
 1926:
 none qualified
 1927:
 none qualified

Founding members of the league
The league was formed from eight teams:
 Borussia Neunkirchen
 SV Wiesbaden
 TG Höchst
 FV Saarbrücken
 1. FC Idar
 SV Trier 05
 FV Biebrich
 Alemannia Worms

Winners and runners-up of the Bezirksliga Rheinhessen-Saar

Placings in the Bezirksliga Rheinhessen-Saar 1923 to 1927

Source:

References

Sources
 Fussball-Jahrbuch Deutschland  (8 vol.), Tables and results of the German tier-one leagues 1919-33, publisher: DSFS
 Kicker Almanach,  The yearbook on German football from Bundesliga to Oberliga, since 1937, published by the Kicker Sports Magazine
 Süddeutschlands Fussballgeschichte in Tabellenform 1897-1988  History of Southern German football in tables, publisher & author: Ludolf Hyll

External links
 The Gauligas  Das Deutsche Fussball Archiv
 German league tables 1892-1933  Hirschi's Fussball seiten
 Germany - Championships 1902-1945 at RSSSF.com

1
1923 establishments in Germany
1927 disestablishments in Germany
Football competitions in Saarland
Football competitions in Rhineland-Palatinate
Southern German football championship